"The Horror in the Museum" is a short story ghostwritten by H. P. Lovecraft for Somerville, MA writer Hazel Heald in October 1932, published in 1933. It is one of five stories Lovecraft revised for Heald. The story has been reprinted in several collections, such as The Horror in the Museum and Other Revisions. Heald had been introduced to Lovecraft by his Providence friend Muriel E. Eddy (see C. M. Eddy, Jr.). Starting in 1965 his letters to friends and other writers were published in which Lovecraft claimed that this story was mostly his own work. E.g. in a letter to Clark Ashton Smith he wrote on 14th of June 1933 (published in 'Dawnward Spire, Lonely Hill', page 420): 
"Yes—the waxwork museum story is mostly my own; entirely so in wording, & also so far as concerns the background of Alaskan archaeology & antique horror. You will find Tsathoggua mentioned."

Plot 

The tale concerns the relationship between Stephen Jones and George Rogers, the owner of a private wax museum specialising in the grotesque in London. Initially cordial, it degenerates as Jones first mocks Rogers then comes to suspect that he is demented with his "wild tales and suggestions of rites and sacrifices to nameless elder gods". Jones takes up Rogers's standing offer to spend a night in the museum and is attacked by his host, who is in turn killed by the entity Rhan-Tegoth that he has been making sacrifices to, and ends up becoming part of the displays. It is implied that his assistant shot Rhan-Tegoth to make him part of said display.

References

External links
 

1933 short stories
Fantasy short stories
Horror short stories
Short stories set in London
Short stories by H. P. Lovecraft